Joan Abse (née Mercer; 11 September 1926 – 13 June 2005) was an English author and art historian. She was the wife of Welsh poet and physician Dannie Abse.

Biography
Joan Mercer was born St Helens, Lancashire, on 11 September 1926. By age 17, she was a student at the London School of Economics (LSE), where she graduated in 1946 with a Bachelor of Science degree. Abse received a Master of Art degree in Art History in 1972 from Courtauld Institute of Art, London. She met her husband Dannie Abse while living in post-war London, and they married by 1951. Together they had three children.

She wrote many books, including the noted John Ruskin: A Passionate Moralist. Richard Ellmann, a journalist at The New York Times newspaper, writes, "What especially animates Joan Abse's book is her keen interest in Ruskin's effort to blend his artistic and social sympathies." 

Joan Abse died in a car accident in Bridgend, south Wales, on 13 June 2005.

Bibliography
Abse's books included:

References

1926 births
2005 deaths
People from St Helens, Merseyside
English art historians
Road incident deaths in Wales
Joan
English women non-fiction writers
Women art historians
British women historians
Alumni of the London School of Economics